DNA polymerase epsilon subunit 2 is an enzyme that in humans is encoded by the POLE2 gene.

Interactions
POLE2 has been shown to interact with SAP18.

References

Further reading

External links 
 PDBe-KB provides an overview of all the structure information available in the PDB for Human DNA polymerase epsilon subunit 2 (POLE2)